Arques is a commune in the Aveyron department in the Occitanie region of southern France.

The inhabitants of the commune are known as Arcasois or Arcasoises

Geography
Arques is located some 16 km east by south-east of Rodez and 6 km south of Laissac. Access to the commune is by road D29 from Agen-d'Aveyron in the north-west passing through the commune and the village and continuing south-east to Ségur. Apart from the village there are the hamlets of Le Mazet in the eastern arm of the commune and Moulin Fabre and Recoules south of the village. Except for two forests in the north the commune is entirely farmland.

The Ruisseau des Gardies rises in the north of the commune and flows south through the village joining the Viaur south of the village. The Ruisseau de Clauverhes rises in the north-east of the commune and flows south-east to join the Viaur south of the village. The Viaur river flows from the south-west through the southern part of the commune and forming part of the southern border before continuing west to the Barrage of Pont-de-Salars then continuing west to eventually join the Aveyron river at Saint-Martin-Laguépie.

Neighbouring communes and villages

Toponymy
The word Arques derives from the Latin arx meaning "fortress".

History
The lordship of Arques extended over the Palanges mountains and included the current commune of the same name plus two enclaves currently in the communes of Segur and Vézins-de-Lévézou. Arques is mentioned in a donation to the Abbey of Conques in 1079. It was later attached to the Abbey of La Chaise-Dieu. It was a dependency of the Lordship of Montrozier, under the Count of Rodez, then of the king.

Administration
List of Successive Mayors

Mayors from 1935

Population

Distribution of Age Groups
The table below compares the gender and age of the population with that of the department of Aveyron in the year 2017.

Percentage Distribution of Age Groups in Arques and Aveyron Department in 2017

Source: INSEE

Sites and Monuments

A Parish Church from the 16th century, a Bell-gable, and an altarpiece from the 17th century - gilded in the 18th century. A Bronze Bell (1755) is registered as a historical monument.
The Rives Viaur, a hilly site at the end of Lake Pont-de-Salars.

See also
Communes of the Aveyron department

Bibliography
Christian-Pierre Bedel (preface, Alain Pichon), Lo Pònt : Agenh, Arcas, Canet, Flavinh, Pradas, Tremolhas, Lo Vibal / Christian-Pierre Bedel e los estatjants del canton del Pònt, Rodez, Departmental Mission for culture, coll.  "Al Canton", 1995, ill., cover ill.; 28 cm, 239 p. (Notice BnF No. FRBNF36688567g) (Occitan/French)

References

External links

Arques on Géoportail, National Geographic Institute (IGN) website 
Argues on the 1750 Cassini Map

Communes of Aveyron